Vodriž is a settlement in the City Municipality of Slovenj Gradec in northern Slovenia. The area is part of the traditional region of Styria. The entire municipality is now included in the Carinthia Statistical Region.

On a hill above the settlement to the west, the ruins of a 13th-century castle can still be seen.

References

External links
Vodriž at Geopedia

Populated places in the City Municipality of Slovenj Gradec
Slovenj Gradec